Asian Highway 47 (AH47) is a  route of the Asian Highway Network, running  from AH43 in Gwalior, India to AH43 in Bangalore, India.It passes through the Indian cities of Gwalior (AH43), Dhule (AH46), and Thane, Mumbai, Pune, Belagavi, Hubballi and Bangalore (AH43).

Route
The route shares portions of Indian National Highways numbered NH3, Mumbai Pune Expressway and NH48. Various cities and towns in the Indian states of Madhya Pradesh, Maharashtra and Karnataka situated on AH47 are listed.

Madhya Pradesh
Gwalior
Shivpuri
Guna
Biaora
Shajapur
Dewas
Indore
Pithampur
Khalghat
Julwania

Maharashtra
Shirpur
Dhule on Asian Highway 46
Nashik
Thane
Mumbai
Panvel
Khopoli
Pune
Satara
Karad
Kolhapur

Karnataka
Nippani
Sankeshwar
Belagavi
Dharwad
Hubballi
Haveri
Ranebennur
Harihar
Davangere
Chitradurga
Tumkuru
Bengaluru

See also
 AH43
 AH45
 AH46

References

Asian Highway Network
Roads in India